Michael Micka (June 18, 1921 – January 4, 1989) was an American football fullback in the National Football League for the Washington Redskins and the Boston Yanks.  He played college football at Colgate University and was drafted in the first round (eighth overall) of the 1944 NFL Draft.

References

1921 births
1989 deaths
American football fullbacks
Boston Yanks players
Colgate Raiders football players
People from Clairton, Pennsylvania
Washington Redskins players
Players of American football from Pennsylvania